Barry Kelly may refer to:

Barry Kelly (canoeist) (born 1954), Australian Olympic flatwater canoeist
Barry Kelly (footballer) (1942–2008), Australian rules footballer
Barry Kelly (referee) (born 1970), Irish hurling referee

See also
Barry Kelley (1908–1991), actor
Barry & Sandra Kelly Memorial Novice Hurdle, a National Hunt race in Ireland